Macrodasyidae is a family of worms belonging to the order Macrodasyida.

Genera:
 Kryptodasys Todaro, Dal Zotto, Kånneby & Hochberg, 2019
 Macrodasys Remane, 1924
 Thaidasys Todaro, Dal Zotto & Leasi, 2015
 Urodasys Remane, 1926

References

Gastrotricha